Rimantė is a Lithuanian feminine given name. It is the feminine form of the masculine given name Rimantas. Individuals bearing the name Rimantė include:

Rimantė Jonušaitė (born 2003), Lithuanian footballer
Rimantė Kunickaitė (born 1993), Lithuanian footballer 
Rimantė Šalaševičiūtė (born 1954), Lithuanian politician, lawyer, and ombudsman
Rimantė Valiukaitė (born 1970), Lithuanian actress

References

Feminine given names
Lithuanian feminine given names